Jacob Alting (27 September 1618 – 20 August 1679) was a Dutch philologist and theologian.  He was professor at the University of Groningen: in 1643 in oriental languages and in 1667 in theology.  His publications were overseen in 1687 by Balthasar Bekker.

Alting was born in Heidelberg, where his father Hendrik Alting was a professor.  The 1618/1619 Synod of Dort forced the family to move to Leiden in 1622 and to Groningen in 1627.

References 
 Schaff-Herzog article on the father mentions him
 Profile at Groningen University

External links

1618 births
1679 deaths
Dutch Calvinist and Reformed theologians
Dutch philologists
17th-century philologists
Dutch orientalists
Academic staff of the University of Groningen
17th-century Calvinist and Reformed theologians
Writers from Heidelberg